Alceu Rodrigues Simoni Filho, or simply Alceu (born May 7, 1984), is a Brazilian former defensive midfielder who last played for Marília Atlético Clube.

Career
Alceu previously played for Palmeiras and Náutico in the Campeonato Brasileiro Série A and had twice spend his career at Japanese side Kashiwa Reysol.

Club statistics
Updated to 23 February 2016.

References

External links

Profile at Montedio Yamagata
Alceu at Soccerway

1984 births
Brazilian expatriate footballers
Brazilian expatriate sportspeople in Japan
Brazilian footballers
Clube Náutico Capibaribe players
Hokkaido Consadole Sapporo players
Expatriate footballers in Japan
Grêmio Barueri Futebol players
J1 League players
J2 League players
Kashiwa Reysol players
Montedio Yamagata players
Living people
Sociedade Esportiva Palmeiras players
Campeonato Brasileiro Série A players
Association football midfielders
Footballers from São Paulo (state)
People from Diadema